Michael A. Zasloff (born July 2, 1946) is an American physician, medical researcher, and entrepreneur.  Zasloff is primarily known for his work on antimicrobial peptides.

Early life
Michael Alan Zasloff was born to a Jewish family, the son a dentist and an artist. Growing up on Manhattan's West Side, he studied at the Bronx High School of Science.

Education
Zasloff did his undergraduate work at Columbia University and earned his M.D. and Ph.D. from the New York University School of Medicine.

He did his residency training in pediatrics at the Boston Children's Hospital and a research fellowship at Johns Hopkins University. In 1975 he joined the National Institutes of Health (NIH) as a postdoc.

Professional career
Zasloff stayed at the NIH after he finished his postdoc, and in 1981 he was made the Chief of the Human Genetics Branch of the National Institutes of Child Health and Human Development. In 1986 he discovered magainins, a family of antimicrobial peptides in the skin of the African clawed frog.

Magainin Pharmaceuticals, Inc. was founded in the late 1980s to commercialize the peptides. Zasloff left the NIH at about the same and went to University of Pennsylvania, in part because the NIH policies made it difficult for him to participate in the company.  Magainin eventually went public and its name was changed to Genaera.  The company attempted to develop squalamine, trodusquemine, and pexiganan (a version of a magainin), but the company closed in 2009 without having brought any products to market.

At Penn, working with Fred Kaplan, Zasloff continued research he had begun at the NIH on the cause and treatment of fibrodysplasia ossificans progressiva.

Zasloff left Penn in 1992 and joined Magainin full time.   He was with the company until its lead product, pexiganan, was rejected by the FDA in 1999 for lack of efficacy compared with the standard of care for diabetic foot ulcers, and he went to Georgetown University's medical school, where he was appointed Dean for Research and Translational Science.  In 2011 Zasloff found that squalamine had antiviral activity.

In 2013 Zasloff co-founded a company called Formula XO that sold haircare products.

He later co-founded a company called Enterin, that intended to develop a derivative of squalamine called kenterin as a treatment for Parkinson's disease; the company received its first round of venture funding in 2017.

Personal life
Zasloff is married to Dr. Barbara Zasloff, a clinical psychologist (whom he met when they were undergraduates at Columbia University), and they have three daughters.

Selected publications

References

Living people
21st-century American biologists
American medical researchers
Jewish American scientists
Jewish physicians
The Bronx High School of Science alumni
Columbia University alumni
New York University Grossman School of Medicine alumni
1946 births
Scientists from New York (state)
21st-century American Jews